Thakur Dalveer Singh is an Indian politician and member of the Bharatiya Janata Party. He is a member of the Uttar Pradesh Legislative Assembly from the Barauli constituency in Aligarh district.

References

Living people
Politicians from Aligarh
Bharatiya Janata Party politicians from Uttar Pradesh
Rashtriya Lok Dal politicians
Uttar Pradesh MLAs 2007–2012
Uttar Pradesh MLAs 2017–2022
Janata Dal politicians
Indian National Congress politicians
Year of birth missing (living people)
Akhil Bharatiya Loktantrik Congress politicians